The bushy-crested hornbill (Anorrhinus galeritus) is a bird in the hornbill family. It is found in Brunei, Indonesia, Malaysia, Myanmar, and Thailand.
Its natural habitat is subtropical or tropical moist lowland forests.

References

bushy-crested hornbill
Birds of Malesia
bushy-crested hornbill
Taxonomy articles created by Polbot